The case of Transco Plc v HMA (No. 1) [2004] S.L.T. 41 was the first ever prosecution for culpable homicide in Scotland with regards to a public limited company. The decision is seen as significant in UK corporate manslaughter law and in particular in Scots law, as there are very few cases which address the criminal liability of corporations under Scots law.

In the case, a public gas transporter was charged with breaking the Health and Safety at Work etc. Act 1974 s.3 and s.33(1) in respect to a gas explosion, which resulted in the death of four people on 22 December 1999 in Larkhall. It was held that Transco had "shown a complete and utter disregard for the public," The court ruled that it was possible to prosecute for culpable homicide; However, it is possible to convict of culpable homicide only if the court could identify an individual or group of individuals being a directing mind in the company; therefore, the charges of culpable homicide were irrelevant and subsequently dismissed. The company was later prosecuted on the charge of health and safety and fined £15m.

This case, along with others of this type paved the way for major legislative changes. This is area is now governed by the Corporate Manslaughter and Corporate Homicide Act 2007.

References

Further reading 
 

2003 in Scotland
High Court of Justiciary cases
2003 in case law
2003 in British law